The Ferrari 500 was a Formula 2 racing car designed by Aurelio Lampredi and used by Ferrari in  and , when the World Championship was run to F2 regulations.

Racing history
For 1952, the FIA announced that Grand Prix races counting towards the World Championship of Drivers would be run to Formula 2 specification rather than to Formula 1, after the withdrawal of Alfa Romeo from the sport. Ferrari were the only team to have a car specifically designed for the new formula. The car was powered by an inline four-cylinder engine which was mounted behind the front axle, improving weight distribution. Alberto Ascari used the car to win his first world championship, winning all but one race with the simple 500. The race he missed was because he was driving the 4.5-litre Ferrari at the Indianapolis 500, however Ferrari won the race he was absent from as well. The following season, Ascari won his second world championship, and Ferrari won all but the final race, which was won by Juan Manuel Fangio, back in racing after an accident which had damaged his neck.

Ascari won seven consecutive World Championship races in the 500, a record which stood until Sebastian Vettel broke it in 2013. If the 1953 Indianapolis 500 (which was run to a different formula, and in which Ascari was not entered) is discounted, the run is extended to nine.

625 F1
For the 1954 season and the return to Formula One engine regulations, Ferrari 500 chassis were modified for the new regulations with the 2.5-litre 625 engine and would win two more races, one each in 1954 and 1955, although it was not quite fast enough compared to the Mercedes-Benz W196 and Maserati 250F. Despite two new models appearing during this period the 625 was not completely replaced until  when Ferrari began using the D50 chassis Ferrari purchased along with the Lancia Formula One team. In May 1955, Maurice Trintignant had won the Monte Carlo GP for the first time for Ferrari.

The car had an independent front suspension and de Dion axle at the rear. Transverse leaf-springs and Houdaille hydraulic shock absorbers were used on both ends.

Partial Formula One World Championship results

(This table contains results of Ferrari works cars; privateer results can be found here)

(key) (results in bold indicate pole position; results in italics indicate fastest lap)

1 – The Constructors' World Championship did not exist before 1958.
2 – Shared Drive.

References

External links
 Ferrari 500 at www.ddavid.com 
 Ferrari 500 F2: Ferrari History
 Ferrari 625 F1: Ferrari History

Tipo 500
Formula Two cars
Formula One championship-winning cars